Palmer Williams Jr. (born 1965) is an American stage and television actor. He is best known for his roles as Floyd Jackson on both Tyler Perry's House of Payne and the sitcom  Love Thy Neighbor.

Career
He is a native of Camden, Alabama. He appears in Tyler Perry's productions including Madea's Big Happy Family, Laugh to Keep from Crying and others during his career.

Filmography

References

External links
 

Living people
People from Camden, Alabama
American male film actors
American male stage actors
Male actors from Alabama
American male television actors
21st-century American male actors
1965 births